Ballygowan is a village in County Down, Northern Ireland. It is within the Ards and North Down Borough. The town of Comber is a short distance to the north-east, the town of Saintfield to the south, and the city of Belfast further to the north-west. It is within the civil parishes of Killinchy and Comber and the historic barony of Castlereagh Lower. It had a population of 3,138 people in the 2021 Census.

History
Before the early 17th century Plantation of Ulster, when many Lowland Scots moved across the Irish Sea to settle in northern Ireland on lands granted by King James I to James Hamilton and Hugh Montgomery, the area of Ballygowan was sparsely inhabited by Irish Gaels. It was within the territory of Clannaboy, and in 1744 the McGowans of the Ards were associated with the Clannaboy O'Neills.

In the late 18th century the village comprised a bridge (over the River Blackwater at the intersection of the Comber/Saintfield and Killyleagh/Belfast roads), a dozen or so small houses and an inn. The surrounding townlands were populated by a great number of small tenant farmers and weavers. The main landlords were Lord Dufferin and Lord Londonderry.

From the mid-19th century through the early 20th century the population of the rural area surrounding Ballygowan declined considerably as many people emigrated to North America or found work in Comber, Saintfield and particularly in Belfast. However, it was during this period, and subsequent to the introduction of the Belfast & County Down Railway in 1850, that the village began to grow. Ballygowan railway station opened on 10 September 1858, but finally closed on 16 January 1950. After the railway closed in 1950 the village became an attractive "dormitory" town and the ensuing 50 years have seen rapid growth.

On Monday, 15 September 2014, the remains of The Baron Bannside (better known as The Rev. Ian Paisley) were buried in the graveyard attached to Ballygowan Free Presbyterian Church. Lord Bannside was a former First Minister of Northern Ireland and a former Leader of the DUP.

Demography

2001 Census
In the 2001 Census Ballygowan had a population of 2671 people.

2011 Census
On Census Day (27 March 2011) the usually resident population of Ballygowan Ward was 2,957 (1,077 households). 
21.39% were aged under 16 years and 12.27% were aged 65 and over;
49.40% of the usually resident population were male and 50.60% were female, and 40 years was the average (median) age of the population.
99.09% were from the white (including Irish Traveller) ethnic group;
11.22% belong to or were brought up Catholic and 
80.19% belong to or were brought up in a 'Protestant and Other Christian (including Christian related)'denominations ; 
75.81% indicated that they had a British national identity, 7.12% had an Irish national identity and 33.69% had a Northern Irish national identity (Respondents could indicate more than one national identity)

Education

Primary 
Ballygowan has one primary school locally, seen at the top of the table below. Other schools are nearby.

Secondary 
Ballygowan does not have any secondary schools locally, but those nearby (<10 mi (16 km) away) are seen in the table below;

All 3 schools offer a direct route ran by Translink, to and from each school.

Bus Services 
Ballygowan has a bus depot connecting Ballygowan to Belfast, Comber, Newtownards and Darragh Cross.

These routes are run by Translink Ulsterbus. The Belfast route uses improved Urby buses run along this route, which include leather seats, free WiFi and USB Charging Ports.

Railways

The Ballygowan railway station was opened by the Belfast and County Down Railway on 10 September 1858. The station was on the once extensive network that connected Belfast Queen's Quay railway station to Downpatrick and Newcastle, County Down.

The station closed in 1950 under the auspices of the Ulster Transport Authority.

See also 
List of villages in Northern Ireland
List of towns in Northern Ireland

References 

Culture Northern Ireland

Villages in County Down
Townlands of County Down
Civil parish of Killinchy
Civil parish of Comber